Super Hits is a compilation album by keyboardist and composer Yanni, released by Sony BMG in 2007. The album peaked at No. 9 on Billboard's "Top New Age Albums" chart in the same year.

Track listing

References

External links
Official Website

Yanni albums
2007 compilation albums